Cesara is a comune (municipality) in the Province of Verbano-Cusio-Ossola in the Italian region Piedmont, located about  northeast of Turin and about  southwest of Verbania.

The municipality of Cesara contains the frazioni (subdivisions, mainly villages and hamlets) Colma, Grassona, and Egro.

Cesara borders the following municipalities: Arola, Civiasco, Madonna del Sasso, Nonio, Pella, Varallo Sesia.

Demographic evolution

References

Cities and towns in Piedmont